Konstantin Aghaparonovich Orbelyan (July 29, 1928 – April 24, 2014) was an Armenian pianist, composer, head of the State Estrada Orchestra of Armenia. 

He was awarded People's Artist of the USSR in 1979. Other positions held by him include the board member of the Union of Soviet Composers, Armenian Composer's Union secretary since 1983, and the Vice-President of All-Soviet Musical Society of the USSR. He is the uncle of his namesake Constantine Orbelian.

Discography
"Государственный эстрадный оркестр Армении п/у Константина Орбеляна" (1968)

As composer
"Birch Whispers", sung by Dmitri Hvorostovsky on the 2005 Delos Records compilation "Moscow Nights" (conducted by Constantine Orbelian).

References

External links

Orbelyan in Jazz: XXth century Russian encyclopedia
Orbelyan
Orbelyan's Official Website
Konstantin Orbelyan at All About Armenian Jazz

1928 births
2014 deaths
Armenian composers
Russian people of Armenian descent
People's Artists of Armenia
People's Artists of the USSR
Armenian jazz musicians
Burials at the Komitas Pantheon

Armenian ballet composers